L'Malouma Saïd (born 1972) is a Mauritanian anti-slavery activist, deputy (Member of Parliament) to the Mauritanian National Assembly.

Life
Said was born a slave in the town of Boutilimit in 1972. Boutilimit, is southeast of the Mauretanian capital Nouakchott.

At the age of seventeen, she became an activist for the emancipation of the Haratin. She joined the Harratin Liberation Organization (El Hor) in 1990 and took part in the emergence of the first opposition political parties, with the RFD or Ralliement des forces democratiques in 1991, and Action pour le changement or AC in 1995. , which engage in particular against slavery. She also takes care of a merchant cooperative and becomes its president. She became responsible for women in the El Hor movement, and a founding member of the anti-slavery organization SOS Esclaves, headed by her husband, Boubacar Ould Messaoud.

In 2006, she was elected to the Mauritanian National Assembly. She is one of four Haratine women elected. She was re-elected in 2013. She is known for her stance on human rights, against discrimination, and for her fight to improve prisons in Mauritania .

In March 2018, she was one of the laureates of the International Women of Courage Award. After the event she visited Arizona.

References

1972 births
Living people
Mauritanian women in politics
Mauritanian activists
Mauritanian women activists
Members of the National Assembly (Mauritania)
People from Boutilimit
21st-century Mauritanian women politicians
21st-century Mauritanian politicians
Recipients of the International Women of Courage Award